Astemir Borsov (born 16 March 1993) is a Russian kickboxer. He is the former Glory of Heroes Junior Bantamweight champion and the current WAKO World K1 Featherweight champion. He is currently signed with ONE Championship.

Combat Press ranked him in the strawweight top ten between May 2019 and August 2020, as well as in the super flyweight top ten between September 2020 and July 2021.

Kickboxing career
Borsov transitioned to professional kickboxing after a successful amateur career, during which he won six WAKO Amateur World and European medals.

In his first professional fight, Borsov participated in the 2016 Glory of Heroes, "Rise of Heroes" tournament. He beat Liu Xiaoyang by decision in the semi finals, and Li Xiang by TKO in the finals.

He fought for the WAKO Pro Flyweight K-1 title in 2017, with his opponent being Lucien Gross. Borsov won the fight by a unanimous decision.

He afterwards participated in the Glory of Heroes Junior Bantamweight tournament. He won a unanimous decision against Wang Junguang in the semi finals, and faced Hakim Hamech in the final match. Borsov won a unanimous decision.

He fought for the WAKO Pro Featherweight title against Luca Cecchetti. Borsov won the fight by a unanimous decision.

Titles and accomplishments

Professional
WAKO-Pro
 2017 WAKO-Pro Flyweight (-54.5 kg) World Championship
 2019 WAKO-Pro Featherweight (-58.2 kg) World Championship
Glory of Heroes
 2018 Glory of Heroes -57 kg Championship

Amateur
Russian Federation
 2014 Russian Kickboxing -57 kg runner-up
 2016 Russian Kickboxing -57 kg Champion
 2019 Russian Kickboxing -57 kg Champion
World Association of Kickboxing Organizations
 2010 W.A.K.O Junior World Championships Low Kick -54 kg 
 2011 W.A.K.O World Championships -54 kg 
 2012 W.A.K.O. European Championships K-1 -54 kg 
 2013 W.A.K.O. World Championships K-1 -54 kg 
 2014 W.A.K.O. European Championships Full Contact -57 kg 
 2015 W.A.K.O. World Championships Full Contact -57 kg 
 2016 W.A.K.O. European Championships Full Contact -57 kg 
 2017 W.A.K.O. World Championships Full Contact -60 kg 
 2019 W.A.K.O. World Championships K-1 -57 kg

Fight record 

|-  style="background:#cfc;"
| 2019-09-07|| Win ||align=left| Luca Cecchetti || 2019 International Professional Kickboxing Championship in Sakhalin || Yuzhno-Sakhalinsk, Russia || Decision (Unanimous) || 5 || 3:00
|-
! style=background:white colspan=9 |
|-  style="background:#cfc;"
| 2018-01-13|| Win ||align=left| Hakim Hamech || Glory of Heroes: Guangzhou 57 kg Tournament Final || Guangzhou, China || Decision (Unanimous)|| 3 || 3:00
|-
! style=background:white colspan=9 |
|-  style="background:#cfc;"
| 2017-12-23|| Win||align=left| Wang Junguang || Glory of Heroes: Jinan, 57 kg Tournament Semi-Finals || Jinan, China || Decision (Unanimous) || 3 || 3:00
|-  style="background:#cfc;"
| 2017-04-28|| Win ||align=left| Lucien Gross ||  || Beaucaire, France || Decision (Unanimous)|| 5 || 3:00
|-
! style=background:white colspan=9 |
|-  style="background:#cfc;"
| 2016-10-15|| Win ||align=left|  Li Xiang || Rise of Heroes 2, Final || Zhangshu, China || TKO ||1 ||
|-  style="background:#cfc;"
| 2016-10-15|| Win ||align=left| Liu Xiaoyang || Rise of Heroes 2, Semi Final || Zhangshu, China || Decision (Unanimous)|| 3 || 3:00
|-
| colspan=9 | Legend:    

|-  style="background:#fbb;"
| 2019-10-22|| Loss ||align=left| Maxim Cazacu || WAKO World Championship, Semi Final|| Bosnia and Herzegovina || Decision (Split) || 3 || 3:00
|-
! style=background:white colspan=9 |

|-  style="background:#cfc;"
| 2019-10-21|| Win||align=left| Pavel Kishkurna || WAKO World Championship, Quarter Final|| Bosnia and Herzegovina || Decision (Split) || 3 || 3:00

|-  style="background:#cfc;"
| 2019-10-20|| Win||align=left| Guy Mor-Alon || WAKO World Championship, 1/8 Final|| Bosnia and Herzegovina || Decision (Unanimous) || 3 || 3:00

|-  style="background:#cfc;"
| 2019-03-22|| Win ||align=left| Mongush Kezhik || Russian Kickboxing Championship|| Russia || TKO  || 3 ||
|-  style="background:#cfc;"
| 2017-11-09|| Win ||align=left| Abzal Dyussupov || 2017 WAKO World Championship, Final || Budapest, Hungary || Decision || 3 || 3:00
|-
! style=background:white colspan=9 |
|-  style="background:#cfc;"
| 2017-11-08|| Win ||align=left| Tyrell Cummins || 2017 WAKO World Championship, Semi Final || Budapest, Hungary || Decision (Unanimous) || 3 || 3:00
|-  style="background:#cfc;"
| 2017-11-07|| Win ||align=left| Tommy Macpherson || 2017 WAKO World Championship, Quarter Final || Budapest, Hungary || Decision (Unanimous) || 3 || 3:00

|-  style="background:#cfc;"
| 2017-09-21|| Win ||align=left| Narek Babajanian  || World Cup Diamond Kickboxing WAKO || Anapa, Russia || Decision (Unanimous) || 3 || 3:00
|-  style="background:#fbb;"
| 2016-11-19|| Loss||align=left| Vladyslav Hyda  || 2016 WAKO European Championships, Final ||  Loutraki, Greece || Decision (Split) || 3 || 3:00
|-
! style=background:white colspan=9 |
|-  style="background:#cfc;"
| 2016-11-18|| Win ||align=left| Emre Karaca  || 2016 WAKO European Championships, Semi Final ||  Loutraki, Greece || Decision (Unanimous) || 3 || 3:00

|-  style="background:#cfc;"
| 2016-04-23|| Win ||align=left| Leonid Chebodaev || Russian Amateur Kickboxing Championship || Ulyanovsk, Russia || Decision (Unanimous) || 3 || 3:00
|-  style="background:#fbb;"
| 2015-11-28|| Loss ||align=left| Johannes Wolf || 2015 WAKO World Championship, Final || Dublin, Ireland || Decision (Split) || 3 || 3:00
|-
! style=background:white colspan=9 |
|-  style="background:#cfc;"
| 2015-11-27|| Win||align=left| Ruslan Bayazitov || 2015 WAKO World Championship, Semi Finals || Dublin, Ireland || Decision || 3 || 3:00
|-  style="background:#cfc;"
| 2015-11-26|| Win||align=left| Daniel Mattos || 2015 WAKO World Championship, Quarter Finals || Dublin, Ireland || Decision || 3 || 3:00
|-  style="background:#fbb;"
| 2014-10|| Loss ||align=left| Johannes Wolf|| 2014 WAKO European Championship, Semi Finals || Bilbao, Spain || Decision (Unanimous) || 3 || 3:00
|-
! style=background:white colspan=9 |
|-  style="background:#cfc;"
| 2014-10|| Win ||align=left| Tierno Gomez Alvero|| 2014 WAKO European Championship, Quarter Finals || Bilbao, Spain || Decision (Unanimous) || 3 || 3:00
|-  style="background:#cfc;"
| 2014-04|| Win ||align=left| Maxim Efremov|| Russian Amateur Kickboxing Championships || Ulyanovsk, Russia || Decision (Unanimous) || 3 || 3:00

|-  style="background:#cfc;"
| 2013-10-|| Win ||align=left| Serkan Katici|| 2013 WAKO World Championship, Final || Guaruja, Brazil || Decision||  || 
|-
! style=background:white colspan=9 |

|-  style="background:#cfc;"
| 2013-10-|| Win ||align=left| Fabrizio Lodde|| 2013 WAKO World Championship, Semi Finals || Guaruja, Brazil || Decision||  || 

|-  style="background:#cfc;"
| 2012-10|| Win ||align=left| Cagdas Yilmaz|| 2012 WAKO European Championship K-1, Final || Ankara, Turkey || Decision||  || 
|-
! style=background:white colspan=9 |

|-  style="background:#cfc;"
| 2012-10|| Win ||align=left| Tsimur Burau|| WAKO European Championship K-1, Semi Final || Ankara, Turkey || Decision (Unanimous) || 3 || 3:00

|-  style="background:#cfc;"
| 2011-10-29|| Win ||align=left| Fabrice Bauluck || 2011 WAKO World Championship, Final || Skopje, Macedonia || Decision || 3 || 3:00
|-
! style=background:white colspan=9 |

|-  style="background:#cfc;"
| 2011-10-28|| Win ||align=left| || 2011 WAKO World Championship, Semi Final || Skopje, Macedonia || Decision || 3 || 3:00

|-  style="background:#fbb;"
| 2010-09-|| Loss||align=left| Aleksandar Konovalov || 2010 WAKO Junior World Championship, Semi Finals|| Belgrade, Serbia || Decision ||  || 
|-
! style=background:white colspan=9 |

|-  style="background:#cfc;"
| 2010-09-|| Win ||align=left| jean Christian Herinaina || 2010 WAKO Junior World Championship, Quarter Finals|| Belgrade, Serbia || Decision ||  || 
|-
| colspan=9 | Legend:

See also 
List of male kickboxers

References

1993 births
Living people
Russian male kickboxers
Bantamweight kickboxers
Sportspeople from Nalchik